ISJ may refer to:

 The International Committee in Search of Justice, a Brussels-based lobby led by Spanish politician Alejo Vidal-Quadras in support of the National Council of Resistance of Iran.
 The Investor Services Journal, a magazine for financial professionals; users and practitioners of investor services.
 The International Socialism, a quarterly magazine published by the British Socialist Workers Party.